A security bug or security defect is a software bug that can be exploited to gain unauthorized access or privileges on a computer system. Security bugs introduce security vulnerabilities by compromising one or more of:
 Authentication of users and other entities 
 Authorization of access rights and privileges 
 Data confidentiality
 Data integrity

Security bugs do not need be identified nor exploited to be qualified as such and are assumed to be much more common than known vulnerabilities in almost any system.

Causes

Security bugs, like all other software bugs, stem from root causes that can generally be traced to either absent or inadequate:
 Software developer training
 Use case analysis
 Software engineering methodology
 Quality assurance testing
 and other best practices

Taxonomy
Security bugs generally fall into a fairly small number of broad categories that include:
 Memory safety (e.g. buffer overflow and dangling pointer bugs)
 Race condition
 Secure input and output handling
 Faulty use of an API
 Improper use case handling
 Improper exception handling
 Resource leaks, often but not always due to improper exception handling
 Preprocessing input strings before they are checked for being acceptable

Mitigation
See software security assurance.

See also 

 Computer security
 Hacking: The Art of Exploitation
 IT risk
 Threat (computer)
 Vulnerability (computing)
 Hardware bug
 Secure coding

References

Further reading
 
 

Computer security
Software bugs
Software testing